This is a list of current, and former, artists for American label Universal Records of Universal Motown Republic Group, or one of its associated labels. An asterisk (*) denotes an artist who no longer records for the label.

Note: Universal Records is not to be confused with global parent company Universal Music Group, the world's largest company in the recording industry, and any of its labels.

0-9

 504 Boyz (The New No Limit/Universal)
 0-1 (The Inc./Universal)
 112 (OneTwelve/The Inc./Universal)
 2 Pistols (Cash Money)
 3 Doors Down (Republic/Universal)
 10 Years

A

 Akon
 Aaliyah (Blackground/Universal)
 Acroma*
 Afroman*
 AHMIR
 Ali & Gipp
 Alien Ant Farm
 Alter Bridge
 Anastacia
 Anberlin
 Ashley Parker Angel (Blackground/Universal)
 Angels & Airwaves
 Asher Roth
 Ashanti (Universal)
 Arab (Sod Money Gang)
 Aubrey O'Day (SRC/Universal)
 Ariana Grande (Republic/Universal)
 Austin Mahone

B

 Merril Bainbridge (Gotham/Universal)
 David Banner (SRC/Universal)
 Baby A.K.A. Birdman (Cash Money/Universal)
 Baby Bash*
 Baby Boy Da Prince (Republic/Universal)
 bbno$
 Bee Gees (US)*
 Drake Bell (Motown/Universal)*
 Black Child (The Inc./Universal)
 Black Veil Brides
 Big Tuck (Republic/Universal)
 Yummy Bingham (Universal; Motown/Universal)
 Blak Jak (Republic/Universal)
 Black Sheep (Mercury/Universal)
 Bloodhound Gang (Republic/Universal)
 Blue October
 Bodyrockers
 Bombay Bicycle Club
 Kippi Brannon* (Curb/Universal)
 Moya Brennan (US)
 B.G. 
 Bun B (Rap-A-Lot/Universal)
 Emma Bunton (US)                                                                                                          * Buddy Dyer (Nonesuch Records/Universal), Orlando Mayer is Now Rock Musician from 2019–present in New York City, New York
 Burna boy  (NG)

C

 Cassidy (Kross Over)
 The Cataracs
 Canibus*
 Chino XL
 Calvin Harris
 Nick Cannon (Can I Ball/Motown/Universal)
 Vanessa Carlton (The Inc./Universal)
 Chamillionaire* (Chamillitary)
 Channel 7 (Universal)
 Children of Bodom (SpineFarm/NuclearBlast/Universal)
 Chayanne (Universal)
 Cherry Monroe
 Chumbawamba* (North America)
 Cimorelli
 Tami Chynn (Konvict Muzik)
 Corey Clark (Bungalow/Universal)
 Colbie Caillat
 Crucial Conflict*
 Curren$y (Universal)
 Crashdïet
 Chris Richardson (Universal)
 Miley Cyrus (Universal/Jive)
 Cimorelli

D

 DΞΔN (Joombas Co Ltd./Universal)
 Dani Stevenson
 Dev
 Down AKA Kilo
 DJ Shadow
 Dia Frampton
 Durrty Goodz
 David Banner

E

 Enrique Iglesias
 Element Eighty*
 Erykah Badu
 Ella Mai

F

 John Farnham
 Flaw*
 Fleming and John
 Donavon Frankenreiter
 Fountains of Wayne
 Free (The Inc./Universal)
 Mannie Fresh* (Universal)
 Forever The Sickest Kids (Motown/Universal)

G 

 Godsmack (Republic/Universal)
 Chris Gotti (The Inc./Universal)
 Irv Gotti (The Inc./Universal)
 Pat Green (Republic/Universal/Mercury)
 Selena Gomez

H

 Hahn-Bin
 Hatebreed*
 Hawthorne Heights
 Heavy D.* (Uptown/Universal)
 Hinder
 Marques Houston (T.U.G/Universal)

I

 ItsNotAdam (Universal Records)
 I Mother Earth

J

 Ja Rule (The Inc./Universal)
 Jack Johnson (Brushfire/Universal)
 Jamiroquai
 Jayme Dee
 Elton John (Rocket/Universal) (US)
 JoJo (Blackground/Universal)
 Juvenile (Cash Money/Universal)
 Jodeci
 Jaya
Jeremy Zucker (Universal/Republic)

K

 Kaiser Chiefs
 Kinfolk Kia $hine (Rap Hustlaz/Universal)

L

 Lifer* (Republic/Universal)
 Lil' Romeo* (The New No Limit/Universal)
 Lindsay Lohan (Motown/Universal)
 Lost Boyz* (Uptown/Universal)
 Lumidee*
 Lucero*
 LSK* (BBG/Universal)
 Lil Wayne (Cash Money/Universal)

M

 Marcus & Martinus
 Teena Marie (Cash Money Classics/Universal)
 Master P (The New No Limit/Universal)
 Marie Sisters (Universal/Republic)
 Damian Marley
 Stephen Marley
 Magic (The New No Limit/Universal)
 Remy Ma* (Terror Squad/SRC/Universal)
 The Mars Volta (Gold Standard Laboratories/Universal)
 Leighton Meester
 Tara McDonald (Mercury Records/Universal Music France/Universal)
 Michael Monroe
 Miri Ben-Ari
 Mika (Casablanca/Universal/FMR/Warner Bros.)
 Mims (American King/The Inc./Universal)
 Monifah* (Uptown/Universal)
 Momoland*(MLD Entertainment/Universal)
 Cherry Monroe
 The Moody Blues (Threshold/Universal)* (US)
 Mori Calliope
 Mr. Capone-E (Hi Power Entertainment/Universal)
 Mr. Cheeks*
 Mr Hudson & The Library
 Mushroomhead (Filthy Hands/Universal)
 Massari

N

 Natalie
 Nelly (Derrty Ent./Fo' Reel/Universal)
 Nicki Minaj (Young Money/Cash Money/Universal)
 Nina Sky (Next Plateau/Universal)                                                                                            
 Nirvana (Universal) (2020–present, Universal Records and Comcast Announces 30th Anniversary of Nirvana's Nevermind on September 21, 2021)
 Nitty

O

 Owl City

P

 Paulina Rubio
 Pharoahe Monch (SRC/Universal)
 Philly's Most Wanted*
 Phung Khanh Linh (HangDiaThoiDai(TimesRecord)/Universal)
 Prince*

R

 RA*
 Raekwon
 Rakim
 Rammstein
 Busta Rhymes (Cashmoney Records/Flipmode/Universal)
 Rizzle Kicks

S

 Raphael Saadiq*
 Saving Grace
 Sauti Sol
 Scissor Sisters
 Shade Sheist* (MCA Records/Universal)
 Sheek Louch*
 Shiny Toy Guns
 Shop Boyz (OnDeck/Universal Republic)
 Sister Hazel*
 Soul For Real* (Uptown/Universal)
 Soulja Boy Tell 'Em* (Interscope/Koch)
 Spose* (Universal)
 Steel Panther
 St. Lunatics
 Sticky Fingaz*
 Swizz Beatz

T

 Taylor Swift (Republic/Universal/Taylor Swift Production)
 T-Boz
 Támar
 Tank (Blackground/Universal)
 Terror Squad
 Tiffany Villarreal
 Timbaland & Magoo*
 Treal
 Turk
 The Fifth Executive Music Group (EMG)
 The Hunger (Universal)

W

 Tyrone Wells
 Devon Werkheiser
 KeKe Wyatt (Cash Money/Universal)
 Wynonna* (Curb/Universal)
 Willie Greene

Y

 Young Buck (Cashville/Universal Music Group)
 Young Life (Bungalo Records./Universal Music Group)
 Young Adz (Universal)

References

 
Universal Records